Crowsnest Ridge is located on the border of Alberta and British Columbia on the Continental Divide.

See also
List of peaks on the Alberta–British Columbia border
Mountains of Alberta
Mountains of British Columbia

References

Crowsnest Ridge
Crowsnest Ridge
Canadian Rockies